Woodbury Castle is an Iron Age hillfort near the village of Woodbury in the English county of Devon, some eight miles southeast of the city of Exeter.

The structure is a prehistoric military type of earthwork.

References

External links
British Explorers page about the castle

Hill forts in Devon
Woodbury, East Devon